The Gulf Coast box turtle (Terrapene carolina major) is the largest subspecies of the common box turtle (Terrapene carolina).

Description 
Gulf Coast box turtles have a domed shell which can grow to 8 inches in shell length. It is generally dark brown or black in color, with yellow striping or blotching, the amount of blotching or striping can vary greatly.

Geographic range 
The Gulf Coast box turtle can be found along the Gulf of Mexico from the state of Louisiana to the state of Florida.

Taxonomy and systematics
Intergrading with other subspecies of the common box turtle that it shares its range with is not uncommon.

Habitat 
They are often found around estuaries and swampy regions, near shallow, permanent bodies of water.

References 

Chelonia.org: care of Box Turtles

Terrapene
Turtles of North America
Reptiles of the Caribbean
Reptiles of the United States
Biota of the Gulf of Mexico
Fauna of the Southeastern United States
Gulf Coast of the United States